Andhra Bhoomi (transl. The land of Andhra) is a Telugu-language daily newspaper India covering the whole of Andhra Pradesh and Telangana with editions from Hyderabad, Vijayawada, Visakhapatnam, Rajamahendravaram, Anantapur, Karimnagar, Nellore, etc. The newspaper is one of the oldest running Telugu-language daily newspapers. The newspaper is owned by Deccan Chronicle Holdings Limited (DCHL).

History
It was founded in 1960 by proprietors of Deccan Chronicle. It is currently owned by Deccan Chronicle Holdings Limited.

Overview 
It also comes with a weekly magazine named Andhra Bhoomi Sachitra Vaara Patrika. With a circulation of 3,65,794, it covers all of Andhra Pradesh, Telangana, and some parts of South India with Bangalore (mainly). It is the Telugu version of English daily Deccan Chronicle. Both newspapers are owned by T. Venkatarami Reddy, who is the nephew of Congress MP T. Subbirami Reddy.

References

External links 

Andhrabhoomi epaper

Telugu-language newspapers
1960 establishments in Andhra Pradesh
Newspapers established in 1960
Secunderabad

Newspapers published in Vijayawada
Newspapers published in Hyderabad